Zanon or Zanón may refer to:

 FaSinPat, formerly known as Zanon, an Argentine worker-controlled ceramic tile factory

People 
 Damiano Zanon (born 1983), Italian footballer
 Fermín Zanón Cervera (1875–1944), Spanish zoologist
 Greg Zanon (born 1980), Canadian ice hockey player
 Jean-Louis Zanon (born 1961), French footballer
 Kiara Zanon (born 2002), American ice hockey player
 Lino Zanon, Italian biathlete and ski mountaineer
 Nicolò Zanon (born 1961), Italian judge and law professor

See also
 Zanoni (disambiguation)

Italian-language surnames
Surnames of South Tyrolean origin